Nathanael Diesel   (1692 – October 26, 1745) was a Danish composer, violinist and lutenist.  He was a teacher to Princess Charlotte Amalie of Denmark.

See also
List of Danish composers

References

This article was initially translated from the Danish Wikipedia.

Danish composers
Male composers
1692 births
1745 deaths